Habaka is a small hill town in northern Jordan, located 75 km north of the capital Amman (in Arabic عَمَّان), and about 5 km south of Irbid (Arabic: إِرْبِد). The region has a very fertile soil along with suitable climate allows the growing of wide variety of high quality crops. The main products are olives and grapes. There is a substantial area of pine forests on the hills that are extending from Ajloun (Arabic: عَجْلون).
Habaka had a population of 4114 in 2015.

History 

Recent discoveries in the area of Tell Johfiyeh -which is in Johfiyeh  near Habaka goes back to the Iron Age. One of the known Islamic scholars called ‘Ali bin ziadah bin abd alrhman alhabaki alshafie’ (in Arabic علي بن زيادة بن عبد الرحمن الحبكي الشافعي) was from Habaka and died in 1364.

It had a population of 18  households and 11 bachelors; all Muslim. They paid a fixed tax-rate of 25%  on various  agricultural products, including wheat, barley, summer crops, vineyards/fruit trees, goats and beehives, in addition to  occasional revenues; a total of  8,000 akçe. 

In 1838 Habaka was noted as being ruined/deserted.

The Jordanian census of 1961 found 428 inhabitants in Habaka.

Demographics 
(1994 Est.)
Population: 1775
Male: 2500
Female:  3254
Families: 450
Buildings: 500
Residential units:  326
Schools: 3

References

Bibliography

External links
Irbid Guide
Greater Irbid Municipality
Irbid News

Populated places in Irbid Governorate